The 1990–91 Syracuse Orangemen basketball team represented Syracuse University in the 1990–91 NCAA Division I men's basketball season.  The Head coach was Jim Boeheim, serving for his 15th year.  The team played home games at the Carrier Dome in Syracuse, New York.  The team finished with a 26–6 (12–4) record, was Big East regular season champions, and advanced to the NCAA tournament.

The team was led by Big East Player of the Year Billy Owens and senior LeRon Ellis.

Roster

Schedule and results

|-
!colspan=8| Big East tournament

|-
!colspan=8| NCAA tournament

Rankings

Awards and honors
Billy Owens – Big East Player of the Year

1991 NBA draft

References

External links
1990-91 Syracuse FINAL (26-6, 12-4) Syracuse Combined Team Statistics
1990-1991 Syracuse Orangemen at Orangehoops.org

Syracuse Orange
Syracuse Orange men's basketball seasons
Syracuse
Syracuse Orange
Syracuse Orange